Henry Macdermott (1798 – 1 February 1848) was an Irish-born politician and merchant in the colony of New South Wales. He served as mayor of Sydney in 1845. He was a sergeant-major in the British Army.

Biography
Macdermott was born to a Protestant family in County Roscommon. His father was a British Army officer. Having enlisted in 1820, Macdermott was a sergeant with the 39th Regiment by the time he had arrived in Australia in 1827. His military career ended in 1831, having achieved the rank of sergeant-major. He was elected as an alderman for the City of Sydney in 1842. He was mayor in 1845, before resigning from council in August 1847 due to bankruptcy.

In 1837, Macdermott married Catherine Small in Sydney. The couple had at least five children. He died on 1 February 1848, aged 49.

References

1798 births
1848 deaths
19th-century Australian politicians
19th-century British Army personnel
Mayors and Lord Mayors of Sydney
Irish emigrants to colonial Australia
Irish Protestants
Dorset Regiment soldiers
Military personnel from County Roscommon